Gʻazalkent is a city in Tashkent Region, Uzbekistan. It is the administrative center of Boʻstonliq District. Its population is 21,600 (2016).

References

Populated places in Tashkent Region
Cities in Uzbekistan